Deekshabhoomi is a sacred monument of Navayana Buddhism located at Nagpur city in Maharashtra state of India, where Dr. B. R. Ambedkar, embraced Buddhism with approximately  of his followers mainly scheduled caste peoples on Ashoka Vijaya Dashami on 14 October 1956. Ambedkar revived Buddhism in India. Ambedkar's conversion to Buddhism is deeply significant for millions of people in India. According to the 2011 India census, more than 87% of the total Buddhist population in India are Ambedkarite Buddhists.

Deekshabhoomi is in Nagpur, Maharashtra, a location regarded as a sacred place, prernabhoomi (inspiring land) of social revolution being atheist and a preparations for social actions against class conflicts, discrimination, inequality also the first pilgrimage center of Ambedkarite Buddhism in India. Millions of pilgrims visit Deekshabhoomi every year, especially on Dhamma Chakra Pravartan Din ie Samrat Ashoka vijaya dashmi ("Mass Conversion Ceremony Day") and 14 October, the memorial day when B.R.Ambedkar embraced and converted to Buddhism here. His final religious act was to embrace Buddhism and envisioned making India The Buddhist nation a prabuddha Bharat Today, the largest stupa in the world is erected in his memory at the site.

Nagbhumi, which is ancient place region where majority peoples of clan Nagvanshi survived and strongly followed Buddhas teachings now in Maharashtra state of democratic republic nation India.

Deeksha literally means 'act of ordaining' and bhoomi means the 'ground'. Deekshabhoomi means the ground where people got ordained as Buddhist. This religious mass conversion at one place was the first ever of its kind in history. Deekshabhoomi is one of two places of considered to be of great importance in the life of Ambedkar, the other being Chaitya Bhoomi in Mumbai.

History

Dr. Ambedkar had declared in 1935 that although he was born as a Hindu, he would not die as one, as conversion was the solution to abandon the caste system. After this declaration and having extensively and exhaustively studied the doctrines of all the major world religions, Dr. Ambedkar would choose Buddhism for himself and his followers.

Buddhism was 2,550 years old in 1956, so it was a notable year of celebration for the Buddhist religious world globally and 14 October was the traditional date of conversion of Emperor Ashoka, the great Indian Buddhist Monarch and the day is celebrated as Ashok Vijaya Dashmi. He selected Nagpur for his conversion ceremony, as he explained in his speech at that occasion, because Nagpur was the homeland of 'Nag' people who embraced Buddhism, supported it with great efforts in its early period, and propagated it throughout India. Ground near the Ramdaspeth area in Nagpur was selected for the ceremony.

On 14 October 1956, Dr. Ambedkar and his wife took the oath of Three Jewels and Five Precepts from the Burmese monk Mahasthavir Chandramani from Kushinagar. Dr. Ambedkar then gave the oath of Three Jewels, Five Precepts, and 22 Vows to his thousands of followers. In this way, Nagpur became the birthplace of Neo Buddhist movement.

Dr. Ambedkar died on 6 December 1956, one and a half months after the Deeksha ceremony. However, this ceremonial conversion continued after his death, converting 15-20 million by March 1959. After his death the 'Dr. Babasaheb Ambedkar Deekshabhoomi Smarak Samiti' (Dr. Babasaheb Ambedkar Deekshabhoomi Memorial committee) was organized for the management of Deekshabhoomi. The committee decided to build a stupa at the place as a monument of that ceremony and a mass conversion of people to Buddhism. Arya Bhadant Surai Sasai is the president of the Dr. Babasaheb Ambedkar Deekshabhoomi Memorial committee, Nagpur.

Architecture

Construction

Deekshabhoomi is spread over four acres of significant land in the city. The stupa was designed by architect Sheo Dan Mal. In 1968, construction started with residential houses for monks, later on P/G College. Construction of the stupa started in July 1978, but it took a long time to finish. The stupa was inaugurated on 18 December 2001 by the President of India K. R. Narayanan.

Stupa

It comprises a large two storied hemispherical buildings with gates resembling a Sanchi gate. Five thousand monks can stay in each storey. The design of the stupa at Deekshabhoomi is based on the architecture of the world famous stupa of Sanchi. But unlike the stupa of Sanchi, Deekshabhoomi stupa is completely hollow inside. It is the largest hollow stupa among all Buddhist stupas in the world. The inner circular hall is spread across 4000 square feet with granite, marble and Dholpur sandstone used in its construction.

On the ground floor, there is a 211 x 211 feet large square hall. At the center of this hall, an image of Buddha is placed. This image was donated to Deekshabhoomi by Thai students studying at Nagpur University. There is a library and a photo exhibition of the events in the lives of Gautama Buddha and Ambedkar.

Above the hall, there is a hollow dome. This dome is surrounded by a veranda. On all four sides, fountains are placed. Above the dome, there is a small slab and a little decorative umbrella. The stupa has doors facing four directions. The doors open in large arcs, which are decorated with Ashok Chakras, and statues of horses, elephants, and lions.

Around the stupa, there is a garden that is maintained by the Nagpur Improvement Trust. Statues of Ambedkar and images of Gautama Buddha are in front of the stupa.

Vihar and the Bodhi Tree

In front of the stupa, on the right hand side, there is a Buddha Vihara with a bronze image of Buddha.

Besides the Vihara, there is the Bodhi Tree: a sacred fig tree. This Bodhi Tree was planted at Deekshabhoomi from three branches of the Bodhi Tree at Anuradhapura in Sri Lanka. Bhadant Anand Kausalyayan brought these branches from Sri Lanka as a memorial of Buddha's enlightenment.

Tourism

Deeksha Bhoomi hosts a memorial to Ambedkar and has been graded an A-class tourism and pilgrimage site by the Government of Maharashtra. Deekshabhoomi is famous for its architectural beauty and historical importance. It is one of the main centers of tourism in India. Every year, thousands of tourists visit Deekshabhoomi, especially on the anniversary of the conversion ceremony. On Dhamma Chakra Pravartan Din, thousands of compact cassettes of Ambedkar, Ambedkar movement and Buddha songs are sold at Deekshabhoomi. The books of few crore rupees in different languages are sold in a single day, this makes Deekshabhoomi a unique place in the world.

Foreign tourists come mainly from the Buddhist countries such as Japan and Thailand.

Literature
Special issue of Lokrajya, the publication of Govt. of Maharashtra on silver jubilee of 1956 ceremony.
Deeksha, Special issue of Daily Sakaal in October 2005
"दीक्षाभूमी'चा भूखंड आवळेबाबूंच्या संघर्षाचे फलित

See also
 The Buddha and His Dhamma
 Bhadant Nagarjun Arya Surai Sasai
 Chaitya Bhoomi
 Dalit Buddhist Movement
 Deekshabhoomi Express
 Global Vipassana Pagoda
 Statue of Equality

References

External links

Dalit monuments
Tourist attractions in Nagpur
Monuments and memorials in Maharashtra
Memorials to B. R. Ambedkar
Stupas in India
Buddhist temples in Maharashtra
Buddhism in Maharashtra
Historical places Vidarbha 
Buddhist pilgrimage sites in India